Sir Robin David John Scott Fox  (20 June 1910 – 25 January 1985) was a British diplomat and writer.

Career
David Scott Fox (Scott Fox is a double-barrelled surname) was educated at Eton College and Christ Church, Oxford, before entering the Diplomatic Service in 1934.

He served in Berlin and Prague before the Second World War. During 1945–47 he was a Foreign Office representative at the Nuremberg Trials of the major Nazi war criminals; then went to Japan to assist in setting up a similar trial.

Later after postings in Brazil, Saudi Arabia, Turkey and at the United Nations, he was Minister to Romania and Ambassador to Chile and Finland.

On his retirement he was part-time Special Representative of the Foreign Secretary 1970–75.

Books
Mediterranean Heritage, Routledge, Abingdon, 1978, reprinted 2014. 
Saint George: the saint with three faces, Kensal Press, Windsor, 1983. 
Darkest Angel, limited edition of 50 copies, London, 1999

References
SCOTT FOX, Sir (Robert) David (John), Who Was Who, A & C Black, 1920–2014; online edn, Oxford University Press, April 2014
Sir David Scott Fox (obituary), The Times, London, 13 February 1985, page 14

External links

1910 births
1985 deaths
British writers
Ambassadors of the United Kingdom to Romania
Ambassadors of the United Kingdom to Chile
Ambassadors of the United Kingdom to Finland
People educated at Eton College
Alumni of Christ Church, Oxford
Knights Commander of the Order of St Michael and St George
Recipients of the Order of the Lion of Finland